NA-241 Karachi South-II is a constituency for the National Assembly of Pakistan that encompasses much of South Karachi.

Area
The constituency is composed of the South Karachi localities of Aram Bagh, Civil Line, Clifton, Defence, Gizri, Mithadar, Kharadar, Nanak Wara, part of Ranchore Line, Saddar, and Serai Quarter.

Members of Parliament

Since 2018: NA-248 Karachi South-II

Election 2002 

General elections were held on 10 October 2002. Abdul Sattar Afghani of Muttahida Majlis-e-Amal won by 24,462 votes.

Election 2008 

The result of the 2008 general election in this constituency is given below.

Result 
Khushbakhat Shujaat of MQM succeeded in the election 2008 and became the member of National Assembly with 52,045 votes, followed by Dr. Mirza Ikhtiar Baig of PPP, who secured 44,412 votes.

Election 2013 

Dr. Arif Alvi of PTI won the 2013 elections with a total of 76,305 votes. The elections were held on 11 May but there were abundant reports of election irregularities which resulted in the Election Commission of Pakistan declaring a re-polling a week later on 19 May 2013 in 42 polling stations out of a total of 186. Alvi was declared the winner with 76,305 votes, followed by Khushbakht Shujaat of MQM at 28,374, and then Naimatullah Khan belonging to Jamaat-e-Islami, who received 11,149 votes. Jamaat-e-Islami boycotted the elections on the afternoon of 11 May (election day), citing massive election rigging in Karachi and Hyderabad.

On 18 May, a day before the re-polling, PTI leader Zahra Shahid Hussain was assassinated outside her house. The entire week, the Muttahida Qaumi Movement (MQM) had been appealing to the Election Commission of Pakistan to hold elections throughout the NA-250 constituency, but their appeal was rejected. Ultimately MQM chose to boycott the re-polling of 42 polling stations in NA-250 on 19 May. Alvi of PTI was declared as a Member of the National Assembly of Pakistan from NA-250 Constituency of Karachi.

Result 

Dr. Arif Alvi of Pakistan Tehreek-e-Insaf was declared the winner with 76,305 votes, followed by Khushbakht Shujaat of MQM at 28,374, and Naimatullah Khan of Jamaat-e-Islami, who received 11,149 votes.

Election 2018 

General elections were held on 25 July 2018. Pakistan Tehreek-e-Insaf's Arif Alvi won the election but vacated the constituency as he was elected 13th President of Pakistan.

By-election 2018

By-elections were held in this constituency on 21 October 2018.

By-election 2023 
A by-election will be held on 16 March 2023 due to the resignation of Aftab Siddiqui, the previous MNA from this seat.

See also
NA-240 Karachi South-I
NA-242 Karachi Keamari-I

References

External links 
Election result of NA-250's official website
Candidates for  NA-247 Karachi South-II

NA-250
Karachi